David P. Samson (born February 26, 1968)  is an American business executive. He was the former president of the Miami Marlins of Major League Baseball. He was president of the Marlins from 2002 until new owner Derek Jeter dismissed him in September 2017. He held the title of Executive Vice President with the Montreal Expos from 1999 to 2002, working in both cities under team owner and former stepfather Jeffrey Loria. Samson was also a contestant on the reality TV program Survivor: Cagayan in 2014.

As president of the Marlins, Samson played a key role in negotiations to secure a public/private partnership to build a retractable roof ballpark which opened on April 4, 2012. He was one of the driving forces behind the rebranding of the franchise following the 2011 season. The rebranding, which was revealed on November 11, 2011, included the changing of the club's name from the Florida Marlins to Miami Marlins and changes to the team's logo and uniforms.

Several controversies have surrounded Samson's tenure in baseball, both in Montreal and Miami. Samson is known for his outspoken nature, especially in dealings with the media and major lawsuits have been filed in response to his business dealings on behalf of the Expos and Marlins.

Early life, education, and family
Samson was born to Allen and Sivia Samson in Milwaukee, Wisconsin, on February 26, 1968. Samson is Jewish. He was the couple's second child, following older sister Nancy. Allen and Sivia divorced not long after Samson's birth, and his mother moved with her two children to New York City in 1976. Samson also has half siblings, sisters Rachel and Samantha and a brother, Daniel, from his parents’ subsequent marriages.

Upon moving to New York City, Samson was enrolled at the Horace Mann School in the Bronx, where he completed grades 1–12. Following high school, he attended Tufts University in Somerville, Massachusetts for one year before transferring to the University of Wisconsin for his sophomore year. He graduated from Wisconsin in 1990 with a B.A. in Economics and a minor in Philosophy. Samson attended the Benjamin N. Cardozo School of Law at Yeshiva University beginning in 1990, receiving his Juris Doctor in 1993.

Samson and his wife, Cindi, were married in 1990 and have three children: Hannah, Kyra, and Caleb.

Following his graduation from law school, Samson founded News Travels Fast in 1993, the first company to deliver The New York Times, and later Barron's and The Wall Street Journal, to Europe on a same-day basis. The rise of internet sites that provided news delivery would eventually bring an end to the endeavor in 1996.

In early 1997, Samson joined Morgan Stanley as an investment advisor, a position he held until joining the Montreal Expos’ front office in December 1999.

Career

Montreal Expos (1999–2002)
Samson was named executive vice president of the Montreal Expos in December 1999, shortly after his then-stepfather, Jeffrey Loria, purchased the ownership stake of Claude Brochu and became chairman, CEO and managing general partner on December 9.

The tenure of Loria and Samson in Montreal would be brief, however. Samson played a key role in negotiating the sale of the Expos and the subsequent purchase of the Florida Marlins in 2002. In a complex franchise swap that reshaped the landscape of baseball in three American and National League East Division cities, Loria sold the Expos to a Delaware partnership, Expos Baseball, LP. The partnership had been formed by a vote of the Major League Baseball owners so that Loria would be free to purchase the Marlins from John W. Henry, who needed to sell the South Florida Club in order to complete his purchase of the Boston Red Sox. The Expos would later be moved to Washington, D.C., by Major League Baseball.

RICO lawsuit following the sale of the Expos
In July 2002, Samson was one of several defendants named in a federal complaint filed in Miami under the Racketeer Influenced and Corrupt Organizations Act (RICO). The complaint was filed by 14 former minority partners of the Expos against Loria, MLB Commissioner Bud Selig, MLB Chief Operating Officer Bob DuPuy, the commissioner's office, and Samson.

The suit alleged that Selig, Loria, and Samson conspired for more than two years to eliminate the Montreal franchise and move it to the United States, and that Selig had conducted mail fraud and wire fraud in the process. The complaint further accused Loria and Samson of conspiring with baseball officials to dilute the minority partners’ share of the team from 76 percent to 6-to-7 percent and of never intending to keep the franchise in Montreal. In response to the allegations, Loria and Samson argued that the partners’ share was decreased because the partners refused to put up additional money that was requested by Loria in cash calls that were permitted by the partnership agreement. Loria also accused the former minority partners of hypocrisy, claiming they had been unwilling to fund any operating losses since 1991 and had directed fire sales of players during the 1990s.

The case against Loria, Samson and MLB essentially ended on November 15, 2004, when a three-judge arbitration panel in New York ruled unanimously that there was no fraud or breach of fiduciary duties committed by Loria and Samson. As a result of the binding ruling, the limited partners dropped their bid for an injunction against the relocation of the Expos and eventually declined to pursue the federal RICO suit.

Purchase of the Marlins and a World Series championship
After Samson led negotiations for Loria's $158.5 million purchase of the Marlins on February 16, 2002, which was approved by MLB owners on February 12, the Club moved nearly 50 employees from the Expos organization to the Marlins.

After a 79–83 season in 2002 in which the Club finished fourth in the NL East, the Marlins made several key additions to the squad in 2003, highlighted by the signing of Ivan "Pudge" Rodriguez and the re-acquisition of Jeff Conine, and surprised the baseball world by winning the second World Series in Club history.

During the regular season, the team improved its record by 12 games, finishing at 91–71 to earn the National League Wild Card berth. The team was fueled in 2003 by Jack McKeon, who became manager on May 11 and led the team to a 75-49 record for the rest of the regular season, the second-best mark in the Majors over that span. In addition, outfielder Juan Pierre, catcher Iván Rodríguez and reliever Ugueth Urbina, and rookie call-ups Miguel Cabrera, an outfielder at the time, and Dontrelle Willis, a starting pitcher, all helped the Marlins in their record run.

The 2003 postseason run began with a thrilling win over the Giants in the Divisional round. The series ended in game four on collision at home plate between San Francisco's J. T. Snow and Rodriguez, who made the tag and held onto the ball for the final out of a 7–6 win. The Marlins went on to overcome a 3–1 deficit in the National League Championship Series against the Chicago Cubs, coming back from a 3–0 deficit in game six and a 5–3 deficit in game seven, both on the road, to reach the World Series.

Florida then stunned the New York Yankees in the World Series in six games, clinching the championship at Yankee Stadium on a complete-game shutout by starting pitcher Josh Beckett.

The Marlins won the World Series, becoming just the 3rd wild card team to do so. They joined the 1997 Marlins and 2002 Angels in accomplishing this feat. They have since been joined by the 2004 Red Sox, 2011 Cardinals, 2014 Giants, and the 2019 Nationals.  However, just like after their 1997 championship, the team fell apart in the following seasons and did not reach the playoffs again until 2020.

New Marlins Ballpark
The biggest challenge facing the long-term stability of the Marlins in 2002 was the club's inability to secure a baseball-only ballpark, with shelter from the extreme summer temperatures and precipitation patterns of the South Florida region. The first two owners of the Franchise, Wayne Huizenga and John W. Henry, respectively, had failed in their efforts to secure funding for such a facility.

Samson led a negotiating team that worked for more than six years to finalize a public/private partnership to build a new retractable roof, air-conditioned ballpark in Miami. Prior to final approval in March 2009, there had been many failed attempts to complete a deal. A new ballpark, originally slated to open in 2005, never came to fruition, due to lack of State funding. Several unsuccessful attempts to secure State funding from Tallahassee delayed the deal even further, as well as changes in potential sites. When the university of Miami Hurricanes left the old Orange Bowl to play its games elsewhere, the original Orange Bowl was demolished by the City of Miami, thereby creating a perfect site for the new ballpark. In March 2009, final approval of the public/private partnership was completed between the Miami-Dade County, the City of Miami and the Marlins. Absent from the final deal was any participation by the State of Florida. As part of the deal, Jeffrey Loria agreed to pay approximately $161.2M of the estimated $515M price tag.

The new stadium funding was included in a $3 billion redevelopment plan by Miami-Dade County that also partly funded a tunnel into the Port of Miami, provided a major infusion of money for the Adrienne Arsht Center for the Performing Arts and funded urban redevelopment plans in Overtown and the Arts & Entertainment District.

Subsequent ballpark-related lawsuit
South Florida businessman Norman Braman filed a lawsuit in January 2008 alleging that the deal between the Marlins and the county to fund the new stadium was an illegal use of taxpayer money that was intended to combat urban blight, and should have been subject to a public vote. All seven counts of the lawsuit were eventually dismissed, the last on November 21, 2008, by Miami-Dade Circuit Judge Jeri Beth Cohen.

Due to the nearly year-long delay caused by the Braman lawsuit, the original timeline for the construction of the stadium was delayed and the opening date was pushed back from the 2011 season to the 2012 season. The official groundbreaking ceremony was held on July 18, 2009, in front of 5,000 fans. The ballpark, and the newly rechristened Miami Marlins, hosted their first regular season game on April 4, 2012, against the St. Louis Cardinals.

Non-baseball appearances
 He co-wrote, with his cousin, Josh Samson, and performed in a play entitled "Do I Do" to benefit the New Theatre in Coral Gables, Florida on December 13, 2009.
 He was a contestant on Survivor: Cagayan, the 28th season of CBS reality show Survivor, where he was the first contestant voted out finishing in 18th place.
 He debuted in a full-length play "Not Ready for Primetime" as Saturday Night Live creator Lorne Michaels in March 2014. 
 He is a regular guest on Melbourne radio station SEN1116 talking sport, movies and popular culture.
 He is a regular guest on The Dan Lebatard Show with Stugotz podcast.
 He hosts the Nothing Personal with David Samson podcast.

References

1968 births
Benjamin N. Cardozo School of Law alumni
Jewish American baseball people
Living people
Major League Baseball team presidents
Miami Marlins executives
Sportspeople from the Bronx
Baseball players from Milwaukee
Survivor (American TV series) contestants
Tufts University alumni
University of Wisconsin–Madison College of Letters and Science alumni
Horace Mann School alumni
21st-century American Jews